Kritsana Daokrajai (born 13 March 2001) is a Thai professional footballer who plays as a centre back for Thai League 2 club Kasetsart, on loan from Buriram United.

Club career

Buriram United
He made the team for 2018 season, after spending time in their junior team at Buriram United Academy. He played in Buriram United's U15 team and helped winning U15 Thailand Youth League 2015 by scoring a free kick in the championship game. He played in their U19 team in U19 competition Coke Cup 2017, won the lower northeast region and later the national level.

He played in 2018 Thailand Champions Cup. He also made the team that compete in 2018 AFC Champions League.

Angthong
In 2020, Kritsana played on loan for Angthong in the Thai League 3.

Khon Kaen
In 2021, Kritsana played on loan for Khon Kaen in the Thai League 2.

International Goals

U19

Honours

Club
Buriram United
 Thai League 1 (1): 2018

References

External links
 

Kritsana Daokrajai
Kritsana Daokrajai
Association football defenders
2001 births
living people
Kritsana Daokrajai
Kritsana Daokrajai
Kritsana Daokrajai